The Corozal was a Scottish-built dredger used on the Panama Canal.  The Renfrew-based firm of Messrs. Wm. Simons & Company won a US government tender for its construction in 1911.  The vessel was launched in November 1911 and taken into US government service as the US Corozal.  It was the most powerful dredger ever built at that time.  The Corozal operated on the difficult Culebra Cut, deepening a channel excavated by hand and dynamite.  It became the first ship to sail through the cut in December 1913, shortly before the canal opened to traffic.  The Corozal was sold to the Arundel Corporation in 1926 and scrapped in 1956.

Construction 

The United States government took over the construction of the Panama Canal from a French company in 1904.  As part of the project, in 1911 bids were invited for the construction of a dredger, which would become the US Corozal.  The Scottish firms Messrs. Wm. Simons & Company won the tender with a bid less than half that of their San Francisco-based competitor.  The Corozal was built at Simons' London Works in Renfrew in the west Central Lowlands.

She was propelled by 2 sets of  triple-expansion, surface-condensing engines supplied by two cylindrical boilers and was capable of making 11 knots. The Corozal also had two auxiliary 2-cylinder engines which operated manoeuvring winches at the bow and stern.

The bucket chain could move at three different speeds to suit different strengths of material. Each bucket could carry several tonnes of weight and there were 50 buckets on each chain. The dredgings could be loaded into an internal hopper or sent by chute into a barge alongside. At the time of her construction she was the most powerful dredger ever built.

The Corozal was launched on 12 November 1911.  She was registered in the United States under the number ON226006.  The vessel was tested by dredging sand and mud off Gareloch and stiffer material in the Musgrave Channel, Belfast, before being sailed to Panama.

 Panama Canal 

In Panama Corozal worked on the Culebra Cut, one of the most difficult parts of the canal to excavate owing to frequent mudslides.  Once the cut had been excavated manually by workers and with dynamite it was flooded and deepened by dredging.  The Corozal was one of around 34 dredging vessels used during the canal's construction.  Although the cut was completed by May 1913 it had been blocked by a mudslide at Cucaracha and the Corozal was one of the dredgers used to clear this final obstacle. In December 1913 she became the first ship to sail through the Culebra Cut, which was the last part of the canal to be dug.  The canal opened in 1914.  During its time on the canal the Corozal excavated  of material.

 Later service 
The US government sold the Corozal '' to the Arundel Corporation of Philadelphia and Baltimore in 1926.  She was broken up at Jacksonville in November 1956.

A model of the vessel, dating from the time of its construction, is in the collection of the Paisley Museum.  It will feature prominently in an exhibition when the museum opens in new premises in 2023.

References 

1911 ships
Ships built in Scotland
Dredgers
History of the Panama Canal Zone